Shirkovo is a rural locality in Prilepsky Selsoviet Rural Settlement, Konyshyovsky District, Kursk Oblast, Russia. Population:

Geography 
The village is located on the Prutishche River in the basin of the Seym, 52.5 km from the Russia–Ukraine border, 66 km west of Kursk, 8.5 km south-west of the district center – the urban-type settlement Konyshyovka, 9 km from the selsoviet center – Prilepy.

 Climate
Shirkovo has a warm-summer humid continental climate (Dfb in the Köppen climate classification).

Transport 
Shirkovo is located 52 km from the federal route  Ukraine Highway, 53 km from the route  Crimea Highway, 41.5 km from the route  (Trosna – M3 highway), 33 km from the road of regional importance  (Fatezh – Dmitriyev), 7 km from the road  (Konyshyovka – Zhigayevo – 38K-038), on the road  (Lgov – Konyshyovka), on the road of intermunicipal significance  (38K-023 – Shirkovo), 2 km from the nearest railway halt Maritsa (railway line Navlya – Lgov-Kiyevsky).

The rural locality is situated 72 km from Kursk Vostochny Airport, 155 km from Belgorod International Airport and 275 km from Voronezh Peter the Great Airport.

References

Notes

Sources

Rural localities in Konyshyovsky District